Biker Boyz: Music from the Motion Picture is the soundtrack to the 2003 film, Biker Boyz. It was released on January 28, 2003 through DreamWorks Records and featured a blend of hip hop, R&B and rock music. The album peaked at number 98 on the Billboard Top R&B/Hip-Hop Albums chart and at number 22 on the Top Soundtracks chart.

Track listing

2000s film soundtrack albums
Hip hop soundtracks
2003 soundtrack albums
DreamWorks Records soundtracks
Alternative rock soundtracks
Rhythm and blues soundtracks
Albums produced by Swizz Beatz